Nuno Tiago Lourenço Santos Abreu (born 22 October 1975) is a Portuguese footballer who plays for Carcavelos mainly as a centre-back.

Career
Born in Lisbon, Abreu began at Carcavelos at age 14, playing two seasons for their under–17 team before, moving for Estoril. He made his professional debut for them on 22 May 1994, in a Primeira Liga match against Vitória de Guimarães, and added two more appearances in the remainder of the season. At 21-years, Abreu left Estoril and joined Atlético CP on the third tier, a move he would follow in the following two seasons, first signing with Machico and then with Portimonense. 

On 13 August 1999, Abreu joined Benfica B. He was call-up by Jupp Heynckes for the first team match against Sporting on 6 May 2000, but did not play. In October 2000, he alongside, Diogo Luís and Geraldo Alves extended their contract with Benfica until 2004. 

In December, Abreu was loaned out to Felgueiras until the end of the season. He played his first game for Felgueiras in a home loss to Porto, and he was directly involved in injuries to two Porto players, Pena and Drulovic. The first required 15 stitches to his right hand and the latter lost two teeth and was knocked-out. He received criticism from Porto president, Pinto da Costa, to which he defended himself, describing the events: "The clash with Pena, was in my opinion, casual and without intent. I think everybody saw it. I am not the blame he got injured, it could happen to me. About Drulovic, I honestly do not remember anything and besides, it is irrelevant because it is thing that happen all the time in football." 

Abreu returned to Benfica in June, but found himself back to the B-team and with an offer to terminate his contract and become a free player. In December, after six-months without competing, he accepted an early termination and signed with Oliveirense. He then began a career in the lower leagues, mainly the second and third tier, representing nine other clubs, before returning to Carcavelos in July 2015, for his final year.

References

External links 

1975 births
Living people
Footballers from Lisbon
Portuguese footballers
Association football defenders
G.D. Estoril Praia players
Atlético Clube de Portugal players
Portimonense S.C. players
S.L. Benfica B players
F.C. Felgueiras players
U.D. Oliveirense players
CU Micaelense players
C.D. Pinhalnovense players
C.D. Olivais e Moscavide players
C.D. Mafra players
Louletano D.C. players
Atlético S.C. players
AD Oeiras players
C.D. Cova da Piedade players